L'Endroit idéal is a 2008 French featurette starring Ronit Elkabetz. It was written and directed by Brigitte Sy. It was later adapted into the 2010 feature-length film, Les mains libres.

Plot synopsis
Barbara (Elkabetz), a film director, is indicted by the police over allegations that she laundered money to Michel (Brandt). Michel is a prisoner that met Barbara during her film project in the prison. During this time they have engaged in an illicit affair and fallen in love. She is forbidden to see Michel again. Yet one year on the couple get married.

Cast
Ronit Elkabetz as Barbara
Carlo Brandt as Michel
Noémie Lvovsky as Rita
Magali Magne as Policière
Bertrand Barre as Policier
Alain N'Diaye as Médecin 1
Florence Janas as Nathalie
Daniel Amadou as Policier
Pascal Ternisien as Inspecteur
Richard Acket as Officier PJ
Philippe Vallet officier PJ
Jean Miez as Beau-père Nathalie
Philippe Lemaire as Avocat

Festivals and awards
The short film was screened at a series of international festivals;

Clermont-Ferrand International Short Film Festival
Istanbul International Short Film Festival (official selection)
Rio de Janeiro International Short Film Festival (special programme)
Festival international de films de femmes
Lutin Short Film Award (nomination - fictional films)

References

External links

Extract of film
Interview with director

French short films
2008 short films
2008 films
Films directed by Brigitte Sy
2000s French films